Pearls Kabaddi World Cup 2011 was the second edition of the circle style Kabaddi World Cup played in Punjab, India and overall fourth Kabaddi World Cup. It was played in various cities of the province from 1 to 20 November 2011 with teams from 14 countries.

Teams
A total of 14 teams took part in this tournament in matches between 1 and 20 November.

 
 
 DQ
 
 
 
 
 
 
 
 
 
 
 DQ
DQ Disqualified during the tournament for doping

Pools
The teams were divided into two pools of seven teams each. Hosts India were placed in Pool A while their traditional rivals Pakistan were in Pool B.

Competition format
Fourteen teams competed in tournament consisting of two rounds. In the first round, teams were divided into two pools of seven teams each, and followed round-robin format with each of the team playing all other teams in the pool once.
Following the completion of the league matches, teams placed first and second in each pool advanced to a single elimination round consisting of two semifinal games, a third place play-off and a final.

Venues
The games were played at:
 Sports Stadium, Bathinda
 Nehru Stadium, Faridkot
 Government College Stadium, Gurdaspur
 Dhudike, Moga
 Nehru Stadium, Rupnagar
 War Heroes Stadium, Sangrur
 Chohla Sahib, Tarn Taran
 Yadvindra Public School Stadium, Patiala
 Guru Nanak Sports Stadium, Kapurthala
 Doda, Muktsar
 Guru Nanak Stadium, Amritsar
 Shaheed Bhagat Singh Stadium, Ferozepur
 Lajwanti Stadium, Hoshiarpur
 NM Govt. College, Mansa
 Guru Gobind Singh Stadium, Jalandhar
 Guru Nanak Stadium, Ludhiana

Prize money
The teams vied for the title as well as the total prize money of  4.11 crore. According to Deputy Chief Minister of Punjab and tournament's chairman Sukhbir Singh Badal, the prize money of this edition of the event been doubled to  2 crore for the winning team. The runners-up earned  1 crore, while the team finishing in third place received  51 lakhs. In addition, the deputy Chief Minister said each participating team would get  10 lakhs. The best raider and stopper of the tournament were awarded with Preet Tractors.

Opening ceremony
The event got off to an elaborate start on the evening of 1 November at Sports Stadium, Bathinda with performances by Bollywood actor Shah Rukh Khan, Sukhwinder Singh and other Punjabi artists, as well as a laser and fireworks show.

Schedule
All matches' timings were according to Indian Standard Time (UTC +5:30).

Group stage

Pool A

 Qualified for semifinals

Australia Forfeits. Afghanistan won by walkover because of unavailability of required minimum of players for Australia.

Pool B

 Qualified for semifinals

 Match abandoned due to USA's expulsion from the tournament

Knockout stage

Semi-finals

Canada had lesser players(8) to play with and as a result 2 points were awarded to Pakistan before the start of match and the start of the 2nd half.

Third place

Final

Canada had lesser players(8) to play with and as a result 2 points were awarded to India before the start of match and the beginning of the 2nd half.

Closing ceremony
The closing ceremony of the Kabaddi World Cup was held at Guru Nanak Stadium in Ludhiana on 20 November.

On this occasion Pakistan's former prime minister Chaudhary Sujaat Hussain, former information and sports minister Chaudhary Nisar Hussain, Pakistan Punjab's former education minister Mian Imran Masood, acting ambassador of Germany Ford Millard, Indian Punjab's chief minister Parkash Singh Badal, deputy chief minister and state's sports minister, Sukhbir Singh Badal, Punjab cabinet minister Tikshan Sud along with his several cabinet colleagues, were also present.

The closing ceremony also included the appearances of Bollywood stars Akshay Kumar, Deepika Padukone and Chitrangda Singh and performances by RDB from Canada, Punjabi singers Harbhajan Mann and Satinder Satti.
.

Broadcasting rights
Television

Doping
National Anti Doping Agency (NADA) was responsible for ensuring that second World Cup Kabaddi tournament is dope free. It was mandatory that in each match four players, two each from both playing teams go for dope test and the players were selected on the spot and he/she could be tested again.

On 12 November 2011, the number of players tested positive for drugs touched 25 from over
100 samples.

Teams from Australia (6), UK (5), US (4), Canada (4), Spain (4), Italy (3), Norway (2) Germany (1), Argentina (1), India (1) lost players on account of doping. Pakistan, Sri-Lanka, Afghanistan and Nepal remained dope-free. The tournament was plunged into a new controversy when four members of the US team refused to give samples to the National Anti-Doping Agency officials for dope tests at Hoshiarpur.
Taking a serious note of the refusal by the players, the technical committee of World Cup kabaddi held a meeting and decided to impose ban on the US team for rest of the matches.

The US team players claimed that they believed it was a well thought-out plan to target their team in doping tests as the organisers were keen on an India-Pakistan final clash.

References

Kabaddi World Cup
Sport in Punjab, India
2011 in Indian sport
Kabaddi competitions in India
November 2011 sports events in India